Doumani Peak is a subsidiary peak,  high, on the southern slopes of Mount Sidley in the Executive Committee Range, Marie Byrd Land, Antarctica. It was named by the Advisory Committee on Antarctic Names for George A. Doumani, a Traverse Seismologist at Byrd Station, a member of the Executive Committee Range Traverse (February 1959) and Marie Byrd Land Traverse (1959–60) that carried out surveys of this area.

References 

Mountains of Marie Byrd Land
Executive Committee Range